Diego Horacio Wayar Cruz (born 15 October 1993) is a Bolivian footballer who plays for The Strongest as either a defensive midfielder or a right back.

Club career
Born in Tarija, Wayar was initially a forward during his beginnings. He played for hometown clubs Unión Tarija and Ciclón before joining García Agreda in 2011.

In January 2012 Wayar joined LFPB side The Strongest, and had his main position changed to a midfielder by manager Mauricio Soria. He made his debut for the club on 29 January, starting in a 1–0 away loss against Nacional Potosí.

Wayar scored his first professional goal on 15 April 2012, in a 3–1 away win against La Paz FC.

International career
On 23 August 2016, Wayar was called up by Bolivia national team manager Ángel Hoyos for two 2018 FIFA World Cup qualification matches against Peru and Chile. He made his full international debut on 1 September, coming on as a first half substitute for Jhasmani Campos in a 2–0 home win against the former.

References

External links
 
 
 
 

1993 births
Living people
People from Tarija
Bolivian footballers
Association football midfielders
Association football fullbacks
Bolivian Primera División players
Club Atlético Ciclón players
The Strongest players
Bolivia international footballers
2019 Copa América players
2021 Copa América players